Fumigatonin is a meroterpenoid of the fungi Aspergillus fumigatus with the molecular formula C28H38O11.

References

Further reading 

 

Heterocyclic compounds with 6 rings
Acetate esters
Lactones